"I Guess I Like It Like That" is a 1991 promotional single written by Australian singer-songwriter Kylie Minogue and British producers Mike Stock and Pete Waterman for Minogue's fourth album Let's Get to It. The song samples 2 Unlimited's "Get Ready for This" written by Phil Wilde, Jean-Paul de Coster and Ray Slijngaard. On the 2015 UK re-release of the Let's Get to It album, Wilde and de Coster were credited as co-authors of the song (Stock/Waterman/Minogue/DeCoster/Wilde). The song also samples Freestyle Orchestra's "Keep On Pumping It Up" and the Salt-N-Pepa song "I Like It Like That".

Background
During this time, Minogue was fascinated by club music. Although her music was always played in commercial clubs, the pop element of her earlier works made the "cooler clubs" tend to "frown upon" her music. Minogue then created the alias "Angel K" for herself and released white label promotional vinyls of tracks including "Do You Dare" and "Closer"; both of the songs later appeared as B-sides on "Give Me Just a Little More Time and "Finer Feelings", respectively.

Critical reception
Nathan Wood from Foxtel's MaxTV called the song "surprising" and claimed it "signaled Kylie's change from a pop princess to an artist with diverse, genre-pushing tastes, and paved the way for her extensive exploration into the world of dance music that would come later." Digital Spys Nick Levine stated he "has even fallen for the 2 Unlimited sample." However, Chris True from AllMusic criticised the stadium keyboard part that lays the foundation of the song, calling it one of album's "noticeable missteps". Nick Griffiths from Select gave a mixed review of the track, calling the song "impressive but blatant clubdom".

Live performances

Kylie performed the song on the following concert tours:
 Let's Get to It Tour
 Showgirl: The Greatest Hits Tour (excerpt during the "Smiley Kylie Medley")
 Showgirl: The Homecoming Tour (excerpt during the "Everything Taboo Medley")
 For You, For Me Tour (excerpt during the "Everything Taboo Medley")

Format and track listing
Promotional Australian 12" single
"I Guess I Like It Like That" – 6:00
"I Guess I Like It Like That" (Edit) – 3:45
"If You Were with Me Now" – 3:10

Visionmasters & Tony King version

"Keep On Pumpin' It" is the title of a single creditably from British producer duo Visionmasters (Paul Taylor and Danny Hybrid) and DJ Tony King featuring vocals from Australian musician Kylie Minogue. It samples Freestyle Orchestra's "Keep On Pumping It Up" and Minogue's vocals from her song "I Guess I Like It Like That". It was written by Minogue, Mike Stock and Pete Waterman.

The single consists two versions: the "Angelic Remix", which was mixed by Vision Masters, and the "Astral Flight Mix", which was mixed by producer Phil Harding.

Background and production
King previously remixed Minogue's track "Step Back in Time".

On the back cover of the CD single, The Visionmasters were said to be "a concept born out of visions at Angels Burnley," a nightclub where Taylor held a residency at throughout the 1990s, and originated his Retro club night there.

Pete Waterman called the song a "more trendy" track. "By this time, Kylie is started to become en vogue in all the clubs and suddenly, it became trendy to play her at the Haçienda. And we don't ever think when we were doing 'I Should Be So Lucky' that Kylie would have ever been played at the Haçienda."

Release and reception
This is the first featured single for Minogue. It was said to be her "classic underground club collaboration".

Formats and track listings
These are the formats and track listings of the major single releases.

CD single
 "Keep On Pumpin' It" (Angelic Edit) - 4:00
 "Keep On Pumpin' It" (Angelic Remix) - 7:24
 "Keep On Pumpin' It" (Astral Flight Mix) - 6:54

7" single
 "Keep On Pumpin' It" (Angelic Edit) - 4:00
 "Keep On Pumpin' It" (Astral Flight Edit) - 3:28

12" single
 "Keep On Pumpin' It" (Angelic Remix) - 7:24
 "Keep On Pumpin' It" (Astral Flight Mix) - 6:54

iTunes digital bundle(Not available at time of original release. Released for the first time as part of iTunes PWL archive release in 2009.)
 "Keep On Pumpin' It" (Angelic Edit) - 4:00
 "Keep On Pumpin' It" (Angelic Remix) - 7:24
 "Keep On Pumpin' It" (Astral Flight Mix) - 6:54
 "Keep On Pumpin' It" (Astral Flight Mix Edit)
 "Keep On Pumpin' It" (Astral Flight Dub)

Charts

Credits and personnel
Credits adapted from the CD single liner notes.

Mike Stock – music producer, songwriter
Pete Waterman – producer, songwriter
Kylie Minogue - songwriter, vocals
The Consul - sleeve design
engineer
Mike Marsh - master
Tim Burgess - vocals, songwriter
Tappin Gofton – designer, art director
Kam Tang - illustrator

Notes

External links
 I Guess I Like It Like That/Keep on Pumpin' It on AllMusic

1991 singles
1991 songs
Kylie Minogue songs
Mushroom Records singles
Songs written by Pete Waterman
Songs written by Mike Stock (musician)
Songs written by Kylie Minogue
Pete Waterman Entertainment singles